Saint Andrew's Cross or Andrew Cross may refer to:

 The x-shaped cross on which Saint Andrew is said to have been martyred by crucifixion 
 Saltire, a heraldic symbol in the form of a diagonal cross, including a gallery of flags

 Flag of Scotland, also known as St Andrew's Cross, a white saltire on a blue field
 Battle flag of the Confederate States Army, a blue cross of St Andrew, bearing either 12 or 13 stars, on a field of red
 Battle flag of the Army of the Trans-Mississippi, a red cross of St Andrew, bearing 13 stars, on a field of blue
 Flag of Alabama, a crimson cross of St Andrew on a field of white
 Flag of Amsterdam, three St Andrew's crosses on a field of black, surrounded by red.
 Cross of Burgundy, or the Cross of St Andrew, a saw-toothed form of St Andrew's cross
 Ensign of the Russian Navy, or St Andrews's flag, a blue saltire on a white field
 St. Andrew's cross (philately), a saltire that occurs on some philatelic items
 Saint Andrew's Cross (BDSM), a common piece of equipment in BDSM dungeons
 St Andrew's Cross, Glasgow, a road junction in Glasgow, Scotland
 Hypericum hypericoides, or St Andrew's Cross, a flowering plant
 Argiope (spider), or St Andrew's Cross spider
 Andrew Cross Award, a British award for religious journalism

See also
Andrew Crosse (1784–1855), a British amateur scientist 
Andrew Cross (footballer) (born 1961), an Australian rules footballer 
 Multiplication sign
X
Crossbuck, a traffic sign used to indicate a level railway crossing